Michele Merlo (born 7 August 1984) is an Italian professional racing cyclist, who last rode for the UCI Professional Continental team .

Merlo's first major professional victory was on the final stage of the 2009 Tour of Britain in London. He rode for Saunier Duval–Prodir for the 2010 season after Barloworld quit the sport.

Palmarès

2008
1st Coppa San Geo
2009
1st Stage 8 Tour of Britain
2013
1st Stage 2 Vuelta al Táchira
1st Stage 1 Tour de Kumano

References

External links

Michele Merlo's profile on Cycling Base

1984 births
Living people
Italian male cyclists
Cyclists from the Province of Verona